The Marcus Cup was a two-session open team event contested by Senior Masters  at the American Contract Bridge League’s summer North American Bridge Championships. From 1946 to 1952, the event winners had been awarded the Faber Cup but in 1953 the Marcus Cup  was donated by friends in memory of Edward N. Marcus and replaced the Faber Cup

From 1946 to 1971 scoring had been by Board-a- Match but was changed in 1972 to international match points with Swiss pairings.
The Marcus Cup was relegated as a secondary championship in 1968 and discontinued after 1978.

Winners

References

Bibliography

North American Bridge Championships